Scorpio Nights is a 1985 Philippine erotic thriller film directed by Peque Gallaga for Regal Films. It was written by T.E. Pagaspas and Romel Bernardino and screenplay by Rosauro "Uro" dela Cruz. It is about a love affair between a young man and a married woman who become entangled in their uncontrollable urge for sex. The film was controversial, but played a key role in defining Filipino erotic films of the decade. It stars Orestes Ojeda, Anna Marie Gutierrez and Daniel Fernando in his acting debut.

Plot
The film is set in a shabby apartment where Danny resides above the room of a security guard and his wife. Every day, the husband goes home, eats his dinner, washes the dishes, goes straight to bed and makes love to his wife. Danny plays Peeping Tom and every night observes through a hole in his floorboard. Unable to control his urges, he goes to the room of the wife where he does the same things that the husband does to her with no resistance. The two perform the act repeatedly until they fall in love with each other. The husband finds out that his wife is cheating on him, when one day he walks in on them while they are having sex, and shoots them both. He then shoots himself while having sex with his dead wife.

Cast

Production
The film was one of several funded by the Experimental Cinema of the Philippines, a government-owned and controlled corporation then headed by Imee Marcos.

Casting
According to Daniel Fernando when he was interviewed by Boy Abunda in his show Tonight with Boy Abunda, he was a student at the University of the East in that time when he was discovered by a talent coordinator in the audition and he would later introduce to Peque Gallaga, the film's director. To prepare for his role, he participated in the acting workshop for one month including the workshop dealing with scenes that contain nudity where he was already comfortable at.

Reception

Legacy
The film is considered one of the most controversial and important Filipino films of its time. Despite being provocative, it has been commended for its social relevance. Set towards the beginning of the end of the Marcos regime, it portrayed the chaotic economy of those years, when street protests related to Ninoy Aquino's assassination were still ongoing.

Critical reception
In the retrospective review by film critic Noel Vera, the sensual scenes of Scorpio Nights were directly similar to Nagisa Oshima's controversial 1976 film In the Realm of the Senses but Gallaga only outshines Oshima in terms of psychological realism and suspense.

Sequel
A standalone sequel, Scorpio Nights 2, was made in 1999, starred Albert Martinez and Joyce Jimenez. It was produced by Gallaga and directed by Erik Matti under VIVA Films. Another sequel, Scorpio Nights 3 starring Christine Bermas, Mark Anthony Fernandez, and Gold Aceron was released on July 29, 2022. It was produced by Peque Gallaga and directed by Lawrence Fajardo under Vivamax.

Remake
The 2001 Korean film Summertime is based on this movie.

References

External links 

1985 films
Adultery in fiction
Filipino-language films
Films directed by Peque Gallaga
Philippine erotic thriller films
Regal Entertainment films
1980s erotic thriller films